Peter D. Harper (born 10 November 1970) is an Australian-American blues rock harmonica player, singer and songwriter. His unique slant on the blues and roots music genre includes his use of the Australian indigenous instrument - the didgeridoo.   Peter D Harper is known for his powerful soulful voice and a deep, almost mystical approach to the roots genre.  Harper has received 14 Music Awards in four different countries including a Gold Record. Billed with his backing band as Harper and Midwest Kind, his most recent release the 2020 Rise Up album debuted at No.3 on the Billboard Blues Album Charts .  This new release is an expansive musical and lyrical journey, stirred up with masterful harp and the deep, woody percussive tones of the didgeridoo. Rise Up was listed in the Top 20 Albums of 2020 by Blues Blast Magazine USA.  Rise Up has been nominated as Best Modern Roots Album by Independent Blues Awards, 2021 and Harper and Midwest Kind has also been nominated as Best Modern Roots Band.   Rise Up follows the highly acclaimed  Show Your Love  which debuted at No. 9, and peaked at No. 3 in the US Billboard Blues Albums chart plus an incredible 25 week run in the Top Ten. Harper is a multiple award-winning artist who tours the Globe up to 200 shows per year. He has had four top ten Billboard releases to date. His latest album  Rise Up was released worldwide on February 11, 2020 through Access Records USA, featuring 10 original tunes.

His interest in the blues was inspired by his grandfather's record collection which included work by Howlin' Wolf, Sonny Boy Williamson II, Muddy Waters, and Little Walter.

Life and career
Peter D.Harper was born in Guildford, Surrey, England, but relocated with his parents to Perth, Western Australia at the age of 10. In the late 1970s he played in a brass band learning to play the euphonium and trumpet. Further inspired by Stevie Wonder's harmonica playing, Harper was self-taught on the instrument and played in clubs before securing his first recording contract.  It was a chance meeting with a Hopi "Dan Running Bear" in Silverton, Colorado, that led him down the path to rediscovering the music of his homeland. Fascinated with the spirituality and culture of the American Natives, he found the same qualities present in the Australian natives of his homeland. On adding the native didgeridoo to his music, Harper says "It is a sound I grew up with, so it seemed natural to add it to my songwriting particularly when the lyrics related to the plight of the Aborigines in Australia. When I added the didgeridoo to the more traditional blues instruments, it worked. The deep woody qualities and its haunting drone seemed to enhance the emotional quality of my stories. The didgeridoo is a spiritual and healing instrument, and it seemed blues music accepted it with open arms. I also owe my life to a clan of nomadic Australian Natives who saved my father and I from starvation when we were trapped at The Fitzroy Crossing (Western Australia), in between two fast flowing river torrents. They gave us enough food and water to last us until the flood had subsided. I feel my music is my way of giving back to these wonderful people". Prior to his introduction to American audiences, Harper released six CDs to great acclaim in his homeland of Australia. In 1987, "Sailing Australia" (America's Cup Theme) peaked at number 71 on the Australian chart; becoming his first charting single. Harper had the honor of backing Blues Legend "Muddy Waters" on harmonica for his Western Australian tour.

Peter D. Harper also performed with bands including the King Pins, the Magnificent Seven, West of the Wall, the Flirts, the Mods, and Good Horse before, in the early 1990s, forming Blue Devil.  They performed for several years prior to recording their debut album, Tears of Ice, which was released by Newmarket Records. Yesterday Is Over (Shock Records, 1996) followed before Harper parted company with Blue Devil.

His debut solo album was self-released in 1997, a live affair called Live at the Soup Kitchen recorded in Detroit, Michigan.  Glass on the Stepping Stone (Full Moon Records, 2000) was his next release, which allowed Harper full control over the songwriting, arrangement and production. He toured in the United States from 1997 onward promoting both albums, and supported acts including John Mayall & the Bluesbreakers, Koko Taylor, Little Feat, Buddy Guy, and Robert Cray. Harper signed another deal with the German record label Nibelung Records in 2000, and planned further European based releases in his own name. After signing with USA label, Blind Pig Records in 2004,  Harper, permanently relocating to the United States in 2005. Harper's USA debut recording Down to the Rhythm (2005) followed by Day by Day (2007) and Stand Together (2010), were issued by Blind Pig Records.  For Harper's  2012 release, Live at the Blues Museum,  he added his  Detroit, Michigan based backing band " Midwest Kind" to his touring/ recording lineup.

Live at the Blues Museum (2012), was released through Blu Harp Records. The next studio recording with Midwest Kind was Show Your Love, which debuted at No 9, peaking at No 3 on the US Billboard Blues Albums Chart. It has had a chart run of over six months.  On February 11, 2020 Rise Up was released worldwide through Access Records, featuring 10 original tunes. This new release debuted at No.3 on the Billboard Blues Charts.

Discography

Albums

Music awards

Detroit Music Awards – "Outstanding Vocalist" (2014)
Best Instrumentalist – "Big City Blues Magazine" USA (2013)
Best Live CD "Blues 411", New York. USA (2012)
Inducted into the Blues Museum Hall of Fame, Canada South Blues Society, Windsor Canada. (2011)
The Bronte Blues Awards, United Kingdom – "Best Instrumentalist" (2009)
Acoustic Artist of the Year TREV, Australia (2005)
Male Vocalist of the Year – "Australian Blues Awards" (2004)
Song of the Year – "Australian Blues Awards", (2004)
Album of the Year, Nasty Harp, Sweet Harp Awards- "Guide to Best of the Blues Harmonicas and Beyond" USA  – Way Down Deep Inside CD. (2003)
Raw Talent Awards Number 1 Song "Never Change the Way She Feels", Australia (2001)
Duke Award Yamaha Rock, Australia
Gold Record – "Sailing Australia" America's Cup Theme

References

External links
Official website
Harper at Blind Pig Records
Youtube page
Reverbnation.com

1968 births
Living people
American blues harmonica players
American blues singer-songwriters
Australian blues singers
20th-century Australian male singers
21st-century American male singers
21st-century American singers
People from Guildford
Musicians from Perth, Western Australia
Blind Pig Records artists
British emigrants to Australia
American male singer-songwriters
Australian harmonica players